John Edmondson may refer to:

John Edmondson, 2nd Baron Sandford (1920–2009), Royal Navy officer, clergyman, conservationist and Conservative politician
John Edmondson (musician) (born 1933), trumpeter, pianist, teacher
John Edmondson (soldier) (1914–1941), Australian recipient of the Victoria Cross
John Edmondson Whittaker (1897–1945), British Labour Party politician
John Edmondson (footballer) (1882–?), English footballer

See also
John Edmond (disambiguation)
John Edmonds (disambiguation)